Grand Duchess Maria Vladimirovna of Russia (born 23 December 1953) has been a claimant to the headship of the House of Romanov, the Imperial Family of Russia (who reigned as Emperors and Autocrats of all the Russias from 1613 to 1917) since 1992. Although she has used Grand Duchess of Russia as her title of pretence with the style Imperial Highness throughout her life, her right to do so is disputed. She is a great-great-granddaughter in the male line of Emperor Alexander II of Russia.

Early life

Birth
Maria Vladimirovna was born in Madrid, the only child of Grand Duke Vladimir Kirillovich of Russia, head of the Imperial Family of Russia and titular Emperor of Russia, and Princess Leonida Bagration-Mukhrani of Georgian, Polish, German and Swedish descent. Her paternal grandparents were Grand Duke Kirill Vladimirovich of Russia and Grand Duchess Victoria Fyodorovna (née Princess Victoria Melita of Edinburgh and Saxe-Coburg-Gotha) through whom she is a great-great-granddaughter of Queen Victoria. Her godfather was Grand Duke Andrei Vladimirovich of Russia, for whom Prince Nicholas of Romania stood in at the christening ceremony, and her godmother was Queen Ioanna of Bulgaria.

Education
Maria was educated in Runnymede College in Madrid and Paris before studying Russian history and literature at Oxford University.

Maria Vladimirovna lives in Madrid. She is fluent in Russian, English, French, and Spanish, and also speaks some German, Italian, and Arabic.

On 23 December 1969, upon reaching her dynastic majority, Maria swore an oath of loyalty to her father, to Russia, and to uphold the Fundamental Laws of Russia which governed succession to the defunct throne. At the same time, her father issued a controversial decree recognising her as heiress presumptive and declaring that, in the event he predeceased other dynastic Romanov males, then Maria would become the "Curatrix of the Imperial Throne" until the death of the last male dynast. This has been viewed as an attempt by her father to ensure the succession remained in his branch of the imperial family, while the heads of the other branches of the imperial family, the Princes Vsevolod Ioannovich of the Konstantinovichi, Roman Petrovich of the Nikolaevichi and Prince Andrei Alexandrovich of the Mihailovichi declared that her father's actions were illegal. As it happened, Vladimir Kirillovich, who died in 1992, outlived all the other male Romanov dynasts, and his daughter had no occasion to assume curatorship.

Marriage
In Dinard on 4 September 1976 (civil) and at the Russian Orthodox Chapel in Madrid on 22 September 1976 (religious), Maria married Prince Franz Wilhelm of Prussia, her third cousin once removed. He is a Hohenzollern great-grandson of Germany's last emperor Wilhelm II and a great-great-great grandchild of Victoria, Queen of the United Kingdom. Franz Wilhelm converted to the Eastern Orthodox faith prior to the wedding, taking the name Michael Pavlovich and receiving the title of a Grand Duke of Russia from Maria's father.

The couple separated in 1982, a year after the birth of their only child, George Mikhailovich, who had been granted the title Grand Duke of Russia at birth by his grandfather Vladimir. Following the divorce on 19 June 1985, Franz Wilhelm reverted to his Prussian name and style.

Succession claims and activities

Maria Vladimirovna is a patrilineal descendant of Alexander II of Russia, who is also a male-line descendant of Elimar I, Count of Oldenburg.

When Vladimir Kirillovich died on 21 April 1992, his daughter Maria claimed to succeed him as head of the Russian Imperial Family on the grounds that she was the only child of the last male dynast of the Imperial house according to the Romanovs' Pauline laws. Although the charter of the Romanov Family Association (RFA), which represents other descendants of the Romanov family, asserts the premise that Russia's form of government should be determined democratically and that therefore the Association and its members undertake to adopt no position on any claims to the Imperial throne, its two most recent presidents have personally opposed Maria's claims: Nicholas Romanov, Prince of Russia, who maintained his own claims to dynastic status and to headship of the Romanov family, stated, "Strictly applying the Pauline Laws as amended in 1911 to all marriages of Equal Rank, the situation is very clear. At the present time, not one of the Emperors or Grand Dukes of Russia has left living descendants with unchallengeable rights to the Throne of Russia," and his younger brother, Prince Dimitri Romanov, said of Maria's assumption of titles, including "de jure Empress of all the Russias", "It seems that there are no limits to this charade".  The supporters of Maria Vladimirovna point to the fact that neither Nicholas nor his brother Dimitri had any dynastic claims due to the morganatic marriage of their parents.

By the Pauline Laws, she is the rightful heir to the throne. The Pauline Laws emphasize male succession before female succession. As an example, if Tsarevich Alexei Romanov had not been murdered in 1918, and died without issue (i.e., without children), his sisters, Olga, Tatiana, Maria, and Anastasia wouldn't become Empresses before male Romanov relatives. 
Alexander III had four sons: Nicholas II of Russia whose only male son died before he could produce heirs, Grand Duke Alexander Alexandrovich of Russia, who died shortly before he was 11 months old, Grand Duke George Alexandrovich of Russia, who died with no issue, and Grand Duke Michael Alexandrovich of Russia whose only son, George Mikhailovich, Count Brasov died at age 20, childless.

From there, the line of succession looks to Alexander III's father, Alexander II. His sons, Nicholas Alexandrovich, Tsesarevich of Russia, and Grand Duke Sergei Alexandrovich of Russia both died without issue. Excluding the future Alexander III, the third boy Grand Duke Vladimir Alexandrovich of Russia – born after the childless Tsarevich and Alexander III, whose descendants couldn’t claim leadership for many reasons – had four sons. The eldest died in infancy and the second eldest, Grand Duke Kirill Vladimirovich of Russia, had one son, Grand Duke Vladimir Kirillovich of Russia. His only child is Grand Duchess Maria Vladimirovna of Russia, making her the legal heir to the Russian throne.

Following the discovery of the remains of Emperor Nicholas II and most of his immediate family in 1991, Maria Vladimirovna wrote to President Boris Yeltsin regarding the burial of the remains, saying of her Romanov cousins, whom she does not recognise as members of the Imperial House (including the grandchildren of Nicholas II's sister Grand Duchess Xenia), that they "do not have the slightest right to speak their mind and wishes on this question. They can only go and pray at the grave, as can any other Russian, who so wishes". At the behest of the Russian Orthodox Church, Maria did not recognise the authenticity of the remains and declined to attend the reburial ceremony in 1998, however according to Victor Aksyuchits, ex-advisor of Boris Nemtsov, the exact reason behind Maria's absence from the state burial for Nicholas II and his family in 1998 was motivated by the Russian government's refusal to recognize her status as official Head of the Romanov House, after asking via a letter prior the funeral ceremony. She has also said, regarding some of her Romanov cousins, that "My feeling about them is that now that something important is happening in Russia, they suddenly have awakened and said, 'Ah ha! There might be something to gain out of this.

Maria hopes for the restoration of the monarchy someday and is "ready to respond to a call from the people". When questioned about the ongoing rift among Romanov descendants, Maria said:

In 2002, Maria became frustrated with the internal strife within the Russian monarchist movement. When representatives of the Union of Descendants of Noble Families, one of two rival nobility associations (the other, older one being the Assembly of the Russian Nobility) were discovered to be distributing chivalric titles and awards of the Order of Saint Nicholas the Wonderworker, without her approval, she published a relatively strongly worded disclaimer.

In 2003, Kirill I Patriarch of Moscow and all Russia stated in a congratulatory message on Maria Vladimirovna's 55th birthday, "you are the embodiment of a Russian Grand Duchess: noble, wise, compassionate, and consumed with a genuine love for Russia. Though you may reside far from Russia, you continue to take an active part in its life, rejoicing when there are triumphs and empathizing when there are trials. It is deeply gratifying to know that, even in these new historical circumstances, you are making a significant contribution to the building of Russia's global standing on the basis of spiritual and moral values, and the centuries-old traditions of the Russian people. The Russian Orthodox Church remains the preserver of the historical memory of the Russian people, and supports, as it has traditionally, the warmest possible relations with the Russian Imperial House."

In March 2013, the Patriarch of the Russian Orthodox Church, made a statement which seems to have drawn further supporters. In an interview, he was asked if any of the Romanovs had a legitimate claim to the throne and responded: "Well, to the second part of your question: are the claims, as you say, of the descendants of the Romanovs to the Russian throne legitimate? I would like to say right away that there are no claims. Today, none of the descendants of the Romanovs make claims the Russian throne. But in the person of the Grand Duchess Maria Vladimirovna and her son George, the succession of the Romanovs is preserved - not to the Russian imperial throne, but simply historically." (Сегодня никто из лиц, принадлежащих к потомкам Романовых, не претендует на Российский престол. Но в лице Великой княгини Марии Владимировны и ее сына Георгия сохраняется преемственность Романовых — уже не на Российском императорском престоле, а просто в истории). Further, the Patriarch noted: "And I must thank this family and many other Romanovs with gratitude for their today's contribution to the life of our Fatherland. Maria Vladimirovna supports a lot of good initiatives, she visits Russia, she meets people, she elevates the most ordinary people who have distinguished themselves to a nobility. I remember well how on the Smolensk land an old peasant woman was elevated to the dignity of nobility, who did so much for those who were by her side during the difficult years of the war and in the post-war period. Therefore, the cultural contribution of this family continues to be very noticeable in the life of our society. " 

In December 2013, Grand Duchess Maria Vladimirovna visited the United States at the request of the Russian Orthodox Church Abroad, which received her with full honours and recognition as head of the Russian Imperial House. On 17 July 2018 she participated in the liturgical commemoration of the centenary of the assassinations of Saints Nicholas II, Empress Alexandra Feodorovna and their children conducted in Yekaterinburg by Patriarch Kirill I.

In January 2021, Grand Duchess Maria announced the morganatic engagement of her son to Rebecca Virginia Bettarini from Italy. Bettarini converted to Russian Orthodoxy and took the name Victoria Romanovna. Grand Duchess Maria granted permission for the couple to marry. She decreed that Bettarini will have the title Princess, with the predicate "Her Serene Highness" and the right to use the surname Romanov. In March, she issued a statement condemning the 2022 Russian invasion of Ukraine, after previously voicing her support for Crimea and Donbas annexation in 2014 by Russia.

Honours

Russian Dynastic honours 
  House of Romanov: Sovereign Knight of the Order of St. Andrew Disputed
  House of Romanov: Sovereing, Grand Mistress and Dame Grand Cordon of the Order of St. Catherine Disputed
  House of Romanov: Sovereign Knight of the Order of St. Alexander Nevsky Disputed
  House of Romanov: Sovereign Knight of the Order of the White Eagle Disputed
  House of Romanov: Sovereign Knight Grand Cordon of the Order of St. George Disputed In abeyance
  House of Romanov: Sovereign Knight Grand Cordon of the Order of St. Vladimir Disputed
  House of Romanov: Sovereign Knight Grand Cordon of the Order of St. Anna Disputed
  House of Romanov: Sovereign Knight Grand Cordon of the Order of St. Stanislas Disputed
  House of Romanov: Sovereign Knight Grand Cordon of the Order of Saint Michael the Archangel Disputed

Russian Orthodox Church 
 : Order of St. Sergius of Radonezh, 1st Class 
  Russian Orthodox Church Outside Russia: Order of Our Lady of the Sign, 1st Class
  Russian Orthodox Church Outside Russia: Medal of John of Shanghai and San Francisco

Moldovan Orthodox Church 
  Moldovan Orthodox Church: Medal of Saint Paraskevi

Ukrainian Orthodox Church 
  Ukrainian Orthodox Church (Moscow Patriarchate): Medal of Saint Barbara

Foreign dynastic 
  Ethiopian Imperial Family: Knight Grand Cordon of the Order of the Queen of Sheba
  Georgian Royal Family: Knight Grand Cross with Collar of the Order of Queen Tamara
 : Bailiff Grand Cross of Sovereign Military Order of Malta
 : Commander of the Order of the Republic
 : Knight Grand Cross of the Order of the White Eagle
  Portuguese Royal Family: Knight Grand Cross of the Royal Order of Saint Michael of the Wing

Awards 
 : Honorary Citizen of the City of Agrigento
 : Winner of the  Russian International Person of the Year
 : Honorary Citizen of the Ivolginsky District
 : Honorary member of the Russian Academy of Arts
 : Medal of the Assembly of the Russian Nobility

Ancestry

See also
 List of Grand Duchesses of Russia

References

Bibliography

External links
 Official website
 Grand Duchess Maria Vladimirovna Article, Video Interview and Photographs
 Prince Cyril Toumanoff's Paper on the Succession 

1953 births
Living people
House of Romanov in exile
Russian activists against the 2022 Russian invasion of Ukraine
Russian grand duchesses
Russian monarchists
Alumni of Lady Margaret Hall, Oxford
Pretenders to the Russian throne
Recipients of the Order of St. George of the First Degree
Recipients of the Order of St. Vladimir, 1st class
Recipients of the Order of St. Anna, 1st class
Recipients of the Order of Saint Stanislaus (Russian), 1st class
Russian people of Georgian descent
Members of the Russian Orthodox Church
Spanish people of Russian descent
Spanish people of Georgian descent
Spanish people of German descent
Spanish people of Polish descent
Recipients of orders, decorations, and medals of Ethiopia